Steve Kearns (born November 23, 1956) is a former Canadian football slotback who played six seasons in the Canadian Football League (CFL) with the BC Lions and Hamilton Tiger-Cats. He was a territorial exemption of the BC Lions in the 1980 CFL Draft. He played college football at Liberty Baptist College and attended Wexford High school in Scarborough, Ontario. Steve's twin brother Dan also played in the CFL.

Early years
Kearns was born in São Luís, Maranhão, Brazil and played soccer as a youth. His family moved back to Canada so Steve and his brother Dan could attend Wexford High school. They first played Canadian football in Grade 11.

College career
Kearns played college football for the Liberty Flames.

Professional career
Kearns was selected by the BC Lions of the CFL as a territorial exemption in the 1980 CFL Draft. He played in 25 games for the Lions from 1980 to 1982. He was traded to the Hamilton Tiger-Cats and played in 30 games for the team from 1982 to 1985. Kearns retired after the 1985 season.

Personal life
Kearns has worked as a chaplain for professional athletes with Athletes in Action after his playing career. He has been a chaplain for the Toronto Raptors, Hamilton Tiger-Cats, Toronto Argonauts and Toronto FC. His wife, Georgie, whom he met at Liberty Baptist College, has also worked with Athletes in Action.

References

External links
Just Sports Stats

Living people
1956 births
Players of Canadian football from Ontario
Canadian football slotbacks
Liberty Flames football players
BC Lions players
Hamilton Tiger-Cats players
Canadian expatriate sportspeople in Brazil
Canadian chaplains
People from São Luís, Maranhão
Sportspeople from Scarborough, Toronto
Canadian football people from Toronto